Ferruhşah Mosque is a small historical mosque in Akşehir, Turkey. In Turkish mescit refers to small mosques.

It is in the same yard as the tomb of Seydi Mahmut Hayrani. According to the inscription of the building it was built by a certain Ferruh Şah in 1224 during the reign of Kayqubad I of Sultanate of Rum. Following its last restoration in 2006, it was opened to religious services.

It has three windows. The building material in the north and west sides is rubble stone. In west and south sides bricks were used together with some collect material.

Historical importance
This mosque was the mosque in which Ottoman sultan Bayezit I was imprisoned by Timur following the battle of Ankara in 1402. After his death in this building, his body was carried to Bursa by his son Musa Çelebi.

References

Seljuk mosques in Turkey
Buildings and structures in Konya Province
Akşehir District
Mosques completed in 1224